The lowland masked apalis (Apalis binotata), also known as the masked apalis, is a species of bird in the family Cisticolidae.  It is found in Angola, Cameroon, Democratic Republic of the Congo, Equatorial Guinea, Gabon, Tanzania, and Uganda.  Its natural habitats are subtropical or tropical dry forest and subtropical or tropical moist lowland forest.

References

Apalis
Birds of Central Africa
Birds described in 1895
Taxonomy articles created by Polbot